José Galera dos Santos Airport  is the airport serving Tarauacá, Brazil.

History
In December 2009, due to operational problems, the airport was temporarily closed. Consequently, the only way to reach the city of Tarauacá by air was via Feijó Airport, located 45 km away from the urban area of Tarauacá. Tarauacá was opened again on August 19, 2010 after undergoing a major renovations.

Airlines and destinations
No scheduled flights operate at this airport.

Access

See also

List of airports in Brazil

References

External links

Airports in Acre (state)